Mats Olof Håkan Nyberg (born 5 September 1958 in Sollefteå) is a Swedish curler and curling coach.

Teams

Record as a coach of national teams

References

External links
 

Living people
1958 births
People from Sollefteå Municipality
Swedish male curlers
Swedish curling coaches
Sportspeople from Västernorrland County
21st-century Swedish people